Lymantria todara is a moth of the family Erebidae first described by Frederic Moore in 1879. It is found in India (Nilgiri) and Sri Lanka.

The caterpillar is a pest of Lagerstroemia parviflora, Shorea robusta, Terminalia bellirica and Terminalia tomentosa.

References

Lymantria
Moths of Asia
Moths described in 1879